Landon Reed Powell (born March 19, 1982) is an American former professional baseball player and current coach. He played in Major League Baseball as a catcher from 2009 to 2011 for the Oakland Athletics. Powell is the current head baseball coach of the North Greenville Crusaders. He played college baseball at South Carolina from 2001 to 2004. He was the Athletics' catcher on May 9, 2010 when pitcher Dallas Braden threw a perfect game.

High school
Powell led Apex High School in Apex, North Carolina to the 2000 4-A state championship as a junior. Because he was already 18 years old, he was eligible to enter the 2000 Major League Baseball Draft and did so. However, he went undrafted because his agent, Scott Boras, did not inform teams he was available. This made Powell a free agent, but he chose to attend college after failing to receive an acceptable offer from an MLB club. This loophole in the drafting system was later closed due to this incident and one a year later involving  pitcher Jeremy Bonderman.

College
Powell attended the University of South Carolina. In 2002, as a sophomore, he had a .292 batting average with 12 home runs and started at catcher as the team went to the 2002 College World Series. The Gamecocks made a run to the finals, but eventually lost to the Texas Longhorns in the last College World Series to have a single game final series. In 2003 the tournament would expand the finals to a best of 3. In 2003 and 2004, Powell once again helped lead the University of South Carolina to the CWS and ranked third on the team in batting average in 2003 (.339) and 2004 (.328). Powell received College World Series all-tournament honors as a catcher in both 2002 and 2003. In his four seasons with the Gamecocks, Powell was a leading offensive threat. He finished with a career batting average of .306 as a switch-hitting catcher, with 44 home runs, 61 doubles, and 193 RBI. The two-time team captain was named as an All-American in 2002 and 2004 as well as all-SEC in his senior season. 

In 2010, Powell was named to the NCAA World Series Legends Team. He and Ryan Garko were named as catchers.

Professional career

Draft
After three seasons with the Gamecocks, Powell was drafted by the Chicago Cubs in the 2003 Major League Baseball Draft as the 733rd overall pick in the 25th round. He did not sign with the Cubs and opted instead to play another season with the University of South Carolina. After his final season there, he entered the draft again in 2004 and the switch hitting catcher was taken in the 1st round by the Oakland Athletics as the 24th overall pick and was the Athletics' first overall pick.

Oakland Athletics
Upon signing with the Athletics on July 22, 2004, he was assigned to play for the Single-A Vancouver Canadians. He played in 38 games and hit just .237. Teammate Kurt Suzuki, also taken in the 2004 draft, got more playing time as he played in 46 games and hit .297. Both were the organizations catchers of the future and only time would tell who would reach the majors first.

Powell began the  season playing for the Rockhounds. In 60 games with them, he hit .292 with 11 home runs. He was promoted to play with the Triple-A Sacramento River Cats on June 28. He played just 4 games for the River Cats before reaggravating the same knee that forced him to sit the 2005 season. Powell missed the rest of the 2007 season. He was considered as a possibility to split the catching duties for the major league club in 2008 but with his injury, it wasn’t possible.

On November 20, 2007, the Athletics purchased his contract, protecting him from the Rule 5 draft.

Powell made his major league debut for the Athletics on April 11, 2009. In his first major league at-bat, Powell doubled in the second inning off the Seattle Mariners' Félix Hernández, driving in two runs. He spent the entire season in the big leagues, yet only appeared in 46 games (36 at catcher, 6 at first base and 3 at DH), as Kurt Suzuki for the second straight year led the majors in games caught. He finished the season with .229 batting average with 7 home runs and 30 RBIs.

On May 9, 2010, Powell caught Dallas Braden's perfect game.

Powell was designated for assignment on December 23, 2011 and outrighted to the Sacramento River Cats on January 5, 2012. On March 9, 2012, Powell was released by the Athletics.

Houston Astros
On March 14, 2012, Powell signed a minor league deal with the Houston Astros with an invite to spring training.  On April 3, 2012, Houston assigned him to the Oklahoma City RedHawks.

New York Mets
On January 18, 2013, Powell signed a minor league contract with the New York Mets with an invite to spring training.

Reassigned to AAA Las Vegas 51s on March 30, 2013.
On June 8, 2013 the Las Vegas 51s released Powell from his contract.

Coaching
On May 9, 2014, Powell was hired by North Greenville University, a Division II school located in Tigerville, South Carolina, to be the head coach of the baseball team. 
 On June 10, 2022, Powell managed the North Greenville Crusaders to their first ever Baseball NCAA DII National Championship winning over Point Loma University with a final score of 5-3.

Personal life
On January 25, 2013, Powell and his wife Allyson lost their infant daughter Izzy, who died from Hemophagocytic lymphohistiocytosis. Powell continues to raise awareness for the need for organ donation, due to his own struggles with autoimmune hepatitis. The Powells have two other children, a son and another daughter.

References

External links

North Greenville Crusader coach bio

1982 births
Living people
American expatriate baseball players in Canada
Baseball coaches from North Carolina
Baseball players from Raleigh, North Carolina
Las Vegas 51s players
Major League Baseball catchers
Midland RockHounds players
North Greenville Crusaders baseball coaches
North Greenville University alumni
Oakland Athletics players
Oklahoma City RedHawks players
Sacramento River Cats players
South Carolina Gamecocks baseball players
Sportspeople from Raleigh, North Carolina
Stockton Ports players
University of South Carolina alumni
Vancouver Canadians players